NYPD is the most common abbreviation for the police organization New York City Police Department.
 
The initialism NYPD can also stand for:

Television
 N.Y.P.D. (TV series), a 1960s crime drama
NYPD Blue, a 1990s police procedural drama series

Organizations

NYPD FC, the Police Department's soccer team that competes in the Cosmopolitan Soccer League